Kalu Ndukwe Kalu is a Nigerian-born American political scientist specializing in comparative institutional development, national security policy, and organizational systems. He is currently a Distinguished Research Professor of Political Science and National Security Policy at Auburn University Montgomery.; and Docent Professor at the University of Tampere, Finland

Background and professional life 
Kalu earned his B. Sc in International Environmental Studies/Environmental Science from Rutgers University, New Brunswick, NJ, with a second major in Philosophy (Existentialism) in 1980; MBA (Organization Theory & Behavior) from Atlanta University in 1982; and a Ph. D in Political Science from Texas Tech University in 1994. He did post-doctoral studies in political science (democratic theory and institutions, citizenship, and international conflict processes) at Yale University (1996-1999), and post-doctoral graduate coursework (Health Policy & Management) at the Yale School of Medicine (1998-2000). He has taught at several institutions including the University of Connecticut, Storrs/Waterbury; and the University of Tampere, Finland (School of Management/Politics) as a Fulbright Scholar & Visiting Professor, 2013-2014. Over the years, he has coordinated at Auburn University Montgomery the General Dwight D. Eisenhower National Security Series: College Program – an outreach program of the U. S. Army War College, Carlisle, PA. His research emphasis is in the areas of institutional development and organizational change, citizenship and administrative theory, IT-leadership interface, technology and culture, complex adaptive systems, national security and intelligence policy, and health care politics and policies.

Books 
 "State Power, Autarchy and Political Conquest in Nigerian Federalism" Published: 2008 
 "Citizenship: A Reality far From Ideal" (co-edited with Nada Kakabadse and Andrew Kakabadse) Published: 2009 
 "Technology, Culture, and Public Policy: Critical Lessons from Finland" Published:2016 
 "Citizenship: Identity, Institutions, and the Postmodern Challenge" Published: 2016 
 "Political Culture, Change, and Security Policy in Nigeria", published (2018).

References

External links 
 “Prof. Kalu delivers the Graduation Lecture, The National Defence College (NDC), Abuja, Nigeria, August 2, 2011: Parts 1-5.”

University of Connecticut faculty
Living people
American political scientists
Nigerian emigrants to the United States
People from Abia State
1954 births
Rutgers University alumni
Atlanta University alumni
Texas Tech University alumni
Auburn University faculty